Events from the year 1624 in Ireland.

Incumbent
Monarch: James I

Events
January 21 – proclamation ordering all Catholic Church ecclesiastics to leave Ireland within 40 days; suspended after a month.
April 27 – the Norton Baronetcy, of Charlton in the County of Berkshire, is created in the Baronetage of Ireland in favour of English politician Gregory Norton.
May 11 – the title of Baron Brereton, of Leighlin in the County of Carlow, is created in the Peerage of Ireland in favour of Sir William Brereton.
September 24 – King James approves a revised programme of reform for the Plantation of County Londonderry.
September 13 – the Style Baronetcy is created in the Baronetage of Ireland in favour of Humphry Style.
December 31 – the title of Baron Herbert of Castle Island is created in the Peerage of Ireland in favour of Anglo-Welsh soldier, diplomat and poet Edward Herbert.

Births
William Caulfeild, 1st Viscount Charlemont (d. 1671)
Caryll Molyneux, 3rd Viscount Molyneux (d. 1699)

Deaths
March 15 – Theobald Dillon, 1st Viscount Dillon, military commander and adventurer.
David Kearney, Roman Catholic Archbishop of Cashel.
Donogh O'Brien, 4th Earl of Thomond, military commander.

Arts and literature
Conclusion of the Contention of the bards.

References

 
1620s in Ireland
Ireland
Years of the 17th century in Ireland